Eothinoceratidae is a family of Lower Ordovician nautiloid cephalopods included in the Cyrtocerinida. The family was originally established for the genus Eothinoceras.

Morphology
The Eothinoceratidae as typified by Eothinoceras is characterized by slender slightly exogastric shells with a rather large siphuncle running along the convex ventral margin. Connecting rings are triangular in section and point straight into the interior of the siphuncle. Septal necks are short to absent.

Genera
In addition to the type genus Eothinoceras the family is said to include Conothinoceras, Desioceras, Margaritoceras, Protothinoceras, Sacerdosoceras, and Saloceras summarized here.  Desioceras Cecioni 1953 has a generally straight, narrow shell with a circular cross section covered with lirae. The siphuncle is marginal, septal necks are essentially lacking. Sutures show a rounded ventral saddle. Margaritoceras Cecioni and Flower 1985 is found in the Obispo Formation, San Lucas, Bolivia. Conothinoceras and Protothinoceras were both named by Chen and Teichert in 1987, Sacerdosoceras and Saloceras by Evans in 2005. Sacerdosoceras from Great Britain is early Middle Ordovician in age. 
Saloceras from lower in the section in Great Britain and France is Early Ordovician.

References
Rousseau H Flower, 1964. Memoir 12. The Nautiloid Order Ellesmericerida (Cephalopoda). State Bureau of Mines and Mineral Resources, New Mexico Institute of Mining and Technology, Socorro, New Mexico.

Ellesmerocerida
Ordovician animals
Prehistoric nautiloid families